Variations on a Theme of Chopin (Variatsii na temu F. Shopena), Op. 22, is a group of 22 variations on Frédéric Chopin's Prelude in C minor (Op. 28, No. 20), composed by Sergei Rachmaninoff in 1902–03. In the first edition, it is noted that 3 of the variations and the final Presto section can be omitted if the performer wishes.

Variations 
The form of the piece is:

Theme: Largo, 9 bars

See also
 List of variations on a theme by another composer

References
Notes

Sources

External links 
 
  Piano.ru - Sheet music download
  Chubrik.ru - Audio download
 Rachmaninoff Variations on a theme by Chopin op.22. Performed by Marianna Prjevalskaya 

Compositions for solo piano
Piano music by Sergei Rachmaninoff
1903 compositions
Chopin
Composer tributes (classical music)